National Lampoon was an American humor magazine that ran from 1970 to 1998. The magazine started out as a spinoff from the Harvard Lampoon. National Lampoon magazine reached its height of popularity and critical acclaim during the 1970s, when it had a far-reaching effect on American humor and comedy. The magazine spawned films, radio, live theater, various sound recordings, and print products including books. Many members of the creative staff from the magazine subsequently went on to contribute creatively to successful media of all types.

During the magazine's most successful years, parody of every kind was a mainstay; surrealist content was also central to its appeal. Almost all the issues included long text pieces, shorter written pieces, a section of actual news items (dubbed "True Facts"), cartoons and comic strips. Most issues also included "Foto Funnies" or fumetti, which often featured nudity. The result was an unusual mix of intelligent, cutting-edge wit, combined with some crass, bawdy jesting.
In both cases, National Lampoon humor often pushed far beyond the boundaries of what was generally considered appropriate and acceptable. It was especially anarchic, satirically attacking what was considered holy and sacred. As co-founder Henry Beard described the experience years later: "There was this big door that said, 'Thou shalt not.' We touched it, and it fell off its hinges." The magazine declined during the late 1980s and ceased publication in 1998.

Projects using the "National Lampoon" brand name continue to this day under its production company successor, National Lampoon Inc. The 50th anniversary of the magazine took place in 2020 and, to celebrate, the magazine was issued digitally for the first time by Solaris Entertainment Studio.

The magazine
National Lampoon was started by Harvard graduates and Harvard Lampoon alumni Doug Kenney, Henry Beard and Robert Hoffman in 1969, when they first licensed the "Lampoon" name for a monthly national publication. The Harvard Lampoon was established in 1876 and became a long-standing tradition of the campus, influencing the later National Lampoon Brand in its evolution from illustration-heavy publications to satirical wit, ranging from short fiction to comic strips. The magazine's first issue was dated April 1970 and went on sale on March 19, 1970. The company that owned the magazine was called Twenty First Century Communications.

After a shaky start for a few issues, the magazine rapidly grew in popularity. Like The Harvard Lampoon, individual issues had themes, including such topics as "The Future," "Back to School," "Death," "Self-Indulgence," and "Blight." The magazine regularly reprinted material in "best-of" omnibus collections. Its writers joyfully targeted every kind of phoniness, and had no specific political stance, even though individual staff members had strong political views.

Thomas Carney, writing in New Times, traced the history and style of the National Lampoon and the impact it had on comedy's new wave. "The National Lampoon," Carney wrote, "was the first full-blown appearance of non-Jewish humor in years—not anti-Semitic, just non-Jewish. Its roots were W.A.S.P. and Irish Catholic, with a weird strain of Canadian detachment. . . . This was not Jewish street-smart humor as a defense mechanism; this was slash-and-burn stuff that alternated in pitch but moved very much on the offensive. It was always disrespect everything, mostly yourself, a sort of reverse deism."

National Lampoon was a monthly magazine for most of its publication history. Numerous "special editions" were also published and sold simultaneously on newsstands. Some of the special editions were anthologies of reprinted material; others were entirely original. Additional projects included a calendar, a songbook, a collection of transfer designs for T-shirts, and a number of books. The magazine sold yellow binders with the Lampoon logo, designed to store a year's worth of issues.

Cover art
The original art directors were cartoonist Peter Bramley and Bill Skurski, founders of New York's Cloud Studio, an alternative-culture outfit known at the time for its eclectic style. Bramley created the Lampoon first cover and induced successful cartoonists Arnold Roth and Gahan Wilson to become regular contributors.

Beginning with the eighth issue, the art direction of the magazine was taken over by Michael C. Gross, who directed the look of the magazine until 1974. A number of the National Lampoon most acerbic and humorous covers were designed or overseen by Gross, including:
 Court-martialed Vietnam War mass-murderer William Calley sporting the guileless grin of Alfred E. Neuman, complete with the parody catchphrase 'What, My Lai?" (August 1971)
 The iconic Argentinian revolutionary Che Guevara being splattered with a cream pie (January 1972)
 A dog looking worriedly at a revolver pressed to its head, with what became a famous caption: "If You Don't Buy This Magazine, We'll Kill This Dog" (January 1973): The cover was conceived by writer Ed Bluestone. Photographer Ronald G. Harris initially had a hard time making the dog's plight appear humorous instead of pathetic. The solution was to cock the revolver; the clicking sound caused the dog's eyes to shift into the position shown. This was the most famous Lampoon cover gag, and it was selected by ASME as the seventh-greatest magazine cover of the last 40 years. This issue is among the most coveted and collectible of all the National Lampoon's issues.
 A replica of the starving child from the cover of George Harrison's charity album The Concert for Bangladesh, rendered in chocolate and with a large bite taken out of its head (July 1974)

Michael Gross and Doug Kenney chose a young designer from Esquire named Peter Kleinman to succeed the team of Gross and David Kaestle. During his Lampoon tenure, Kleinman was also the art director of Heavy Metal magazine, published by the same company. The best known of Kleinman's Lampoon covers were "Stevie Wonder with 3-D Glasses" painted by Sol Korby, a photographed "Nose to The Grindstone" cover depicting a man's face being pressed against a spinning grinder wheel for the Work issue, the "JFK's First 6000 Days" issue featuring a portrait of an old John F. Kennedy, the "Fat Elvis" cover which appeared a year before Elvis Presley died, and many of the Mara McAfee covers done in a classic Norman Rockwell style. Kleinman designed the logos for Animal House and Heavy Metal. 
Kleinman left in 1979 to open an ad agency.

He was succeeded by Skip Johnson, the designer responsible for the Sunday Newspaper Parody and the "Arab Getting Punched in the Face" cover of the Revenge issue. Johnson went on to The New York Times. He was followed by Michael Grossman, who changed the logo and style of the magazine.

In 1984, Kleinman returned as creative director and went back to the 1970s logo and style, bringing back many of the artists and writers from the magazine's heyday. He left four years later to pursue a career in corporate marketing. At that time, the National Lampoon magazine entered a period of precipitous decline.

Editorial
Every regular monthly issue of the magazine had an editorial at the front of the magazine. This often appeared to be straightforward but was always a parody. It was written by whoever was the editor of that particular issue, since that role rotated among the staff, but Kenney had been the main writer of them for the first few issues. Some issues were guest-edited.

Staff
The magazine was an outlet for some notable writing talents, including Douglas Kenney, Henry Beard, George W. S. Trow, Chris Miller, P. J. O'Rourke, Michael O'Donoghue, Anne Beatts, Chris Rush, Sean Kelly, Tony Hendra, Brian McConnachie, Gerald Sussman, Derek Pell, Ellis Weiner, Ted Mann, Chris Cluess, Al Jean, Mike Reiss, Jeff Greenfield, John Hughes and Ed Subitzky.

The work of many important cartoonists, photographers, and illustrators appeared in the magazine's pages, including Neal Adams, Gahan Wilson, Robert Grossman, Michael Sullivan, Ron Barrett, Peter Bramley, Vaughn Bode, Bruce McCall, Rick Meyerowitz, Warren Sattler, M. K. Brown, Shary Flenniken, Bobby London, Edward Gorey, Jeff Jones, Joe Orlando, Arnold Roth, Rich Grote, Ed Subitzky, Mara McAfee, Sam Gross, Charles Rodrigues, Buddy Hickerson, B. K. Taylor, Birney Lettick, Frank Frazetta, Boris Vallejo, Marvin Mattelson, Stan Mack, Chris Callis, John E. Barrett, Raymond Kursar, Andy Lackow, and David C.K. McClelland.

Comedy stars John Belushi, Chevy Chase, Gilda Radner, Bill Murray, Brian Doyle Murray, Harold Ramis, and Richard Belzer first gained national attention for their performances in the National Lampoon's stage show and radio show. The first three subsequently went on to become part of Saturday Night Live original wave of Not Ready for Primetime Players, Bill Murray replaced Chase when Chase left SNL after the first season, and Brian Doyle Murray later appeared as an SNL regular. Harold Ramis went on to star in the Canadian sketch show SCTV and assumed role as its head writer, then left after season 1 to be a prolific director and writer working on such films as Animal House, Caddyshack, Ghostbusters, and many more. Brian Doyle Murray has had roles in dozens of films, and Belzer is an Emmy Award-winning TV actor.

Gerald L. "Jerry" Taylor  was the publisher, followed by William T. Lippe. The business side of the magazine was controlled by Matty Simmons, who was chairman of the board and CEO of Twenty First Century Communications, a publishing company.

True Facts
"True Facts" was a section near the front of the magazine which contained true but ridiculous items from real life. Together with the masthead, it was one of the few parts of the magazine that was factual. As was explained in the introduction to the True Facts 1981 newsstand species, the True Facts column was started in 1972 by Henry Beard, and it was based on a feature called "True Stories" in the Publication Private Eye. It was essentially a column of funny news briefs. P. J. O'Rourke created the first "True Facts Section" in August 1977. This section included photographs of unintentionally funny signage, extracts from ludicrous newspaper reports, strange headlines, and so on. In 1981 and for many subsequent years John Bendel was in charge of the "True Facts" section of the magazine. John Bender produced the 1981 Newsstand Special mentioned above. Steven Brykman edited the "True Facts" section of the National Lampoon website. Several "True Facts" compilation books were published during the 1980s and early 90s, and several all-True-Facts issues of the magazine were published during the 1980s.

Foto Funnies
Most issues of the magazine featured one or more "Foto Funny" or fumetti, comic strips that use photographs instead of drawings as illustrations. The characters who appeared in the Lampoon's Foto Funnies were usually writers, editors, artists, photographers or contributing editors of the magazine, often cast alongside nude or semi-nude models. In 1980, a paperback compilation book, National Lampoon Foto Funnies which appeared as a part of National Lampoon Comics, was published.

Funny Pages
The "Funny Pages" was a large section at the back of the magazine that was composed entirely of comic strips of various kinds. These included work from a number of artists who also had pieces published in the main part of the magazine, including Gahan Wilson, Ed Subitzky and Vaughn Bode, as well as artists whose work was only published in this section. The regular strips included "Dirty Duck" by Bobby London, "Trots and Bonnie" by Shary Flenniken, "The Appletons" and "Timberland Tales" by B. K. Taylor, "Politeness Man" by Ron Barrett, and many other strips. A compilation of Gahan Wilson's "Nuts" strip was published in 2011. The Funny Pages logo header art, which was positioned above Gahan Wilson's "Nuts" in each issue, and showed a comfortable, old-fashioned family reading newspaper-sized funny papers, was drawn by Mike Kaluta.

Other merchandise
From time to time, the magazine advertised Lampoon-related merchandise for sale, including T-shirts that had been specially designed.

Chronology
The magazine existed from 1970 to 1998. Some consider its finest period was from 1971 to 1975, although it continued to be produced on a monthly schedule throughout the 1970s and the early 1980s and did well during that time.

However, during the late 1980s, a much more serious decline set in. Upstart video distributor Vestron Inc. attempted a takeover bid in 1986, but the board members of the magazine rejected the offer. In 1989, the company that controlled the magazine and its related projects (which was part of "Twenty First Century Communications") was the subject of a hostile takeover by film producer Daniel Grodnik and actor Tim Matheson, who had starred in the Lampoon's first big hit, Animal House. In 1990 it was sold outright to another company, "J2 Communications".

At that point "National Lampoon" was considered valuable only as a brand name that could be licensed out to other companies. The magazine was issued erratically and rarely from 1991 onwards. 1998 saw the last issue.

1970
The first issue was April 1970; by November of that year, Michael C. Gross had become the art director. He achieved a unified, sophisticated, and integrated look for the magazine, which greatly enhanced its humorous appeal.  The sixth issue from September 1970, entitled "Show Biz," got the company in hot water with The Walt Disney Company after a lawsuit was threatened because of the issue's cover, which showed a drawing of Minnie Mouse topless, wearing pasties.

1973–1975
National Lampoon's most successful sales period was 1973–75. Its national circulation peaked at 1,000,096 copies sold of the October 1974 "Pubescence" issue. The 1974 monthly average was 830,000, which was also a peak. Former Lampoon editor Tony Hendra's book Going Too Far includes a series of precise circulation figures.

It was also during this time that National Lampoon: Lemmings stage show and The National Lampoon Radio Hour show was broadcast, bringing interest and acclaim to the National Lampoon brand with magazine talent like writer Michael O'Donoghue who would go on to write for Saturday Night Live.

The magazine was considered by many to be at its creative zenith during this time. It should however be noted that the publishing industry's newsstand sales were excellent for many other titles during that time: there were sales peaks for Mad (more than 2 million), Playboy (more than 7 million), and TV Guide (more than 19 million).

1975
Some fans consider the glory days of National Lampoon to have ended in 1975, although the magazine remained popular and profitable long after that point. During 1975, the three founders (Kenney, Beard, and Hoffman) took advantage of a buyout clause in their contracts for $7.5 million (although Kenney remained on the magazine's masthead as a senior editor until about 1976). About the same time, writers Michael O'Donoghue and Anne Beatts left to join the NBC comedy show Saturday Night Live (SNL). At the same time, the National Lampoon Show's John Belushi and Gilda Radner left the troupe to join the original septet of SNL's Not Ready for Primetime Players.

The magazine was a springboard to the cinema of the United States for a generation of comedy writers, directors, and performers. Various alumni went on to create and write for SNL, The David Letterman Show, SCTV, The Simpsons, Married... with Children, Night Court, and various films including National Lampoon's Animal House, Caddyshack, National Lampoon's Vacation, and Ghostbusters.

As some of the original creators departed, the magazine remained popular and profitable as it had the emergence of John Hughes and editor-in-chief P.J. O'Rourke, along with artists and writers such as Gerry Sussman, Ellis Weiner, Tony Hendra, Ted Mann, Peter Kleinman, Chris Cluess, Stu Kreisman, John Weidman, Jeff Greenfield, Bruce McCall, and Rick Meyerowitz.

1985
In 1985, Matty Simmons (who had been working only on the business end of the Lampoon up to that point) took over as editor-in-chief. He fired the entire editorial staff, and appointed his two sons, Michael Simmons and Andy Simmons, as editors, Peter Kleinman as creative director and editor, and Larry "Ratso" Sloman as executive editor. The magazine was on an increasingly shaky financial footing, and beginning in November 1986, the magazine was published six times a year instead of every month.

1989
On December 29, 1988, producer Daniel Grodnik and actor Tim Matheson  (who played "Otter" in the 1978 film National Lampoon's Animal House) filed with the SEC that their production company, Grodnick/Matheson Co., had acquired voting control of 21.3 percent of National Lampoon Inc. stock and wanted to gain management control. They were named to the company's board in January 1989, and eventually took control of the company by purchasing the ten-percent share of Simmons, who departed the company. Grodnik and Matheson became the co-chairmen/co-CEOs. During their tenure, the stock went up from under $2 to $6, and the magazine was able to double its monthly ad pages. The company moved its headquarters from New York to Los Angeles to focus on film and television. The publishing operation stayed in New York. Grodnik and Matheson sold the company in 1990.

1990
In 1990, the magazine (and more importantly, the rights to the brand name "National Lampoon") were bought by a company called J2 Communications (a company previously known for marketing Tim Conway's Dorf videos), headed by James P. Jimirro.

J2 Communications' focus was to make money by licensing out the "National Lampoon" brand. The company was contractually obligated to publish at least one new issue of the magazine per year to retain the rights to the Lampoon name. However, the company had very little interest in the magazine; throughout the 1990s, the number of issues per year declined precipitously and erratically. In 1991, an attempt at monthly publication was made; nine issues were produced that year. Only two issues were released in 1992. This was followed by one issue in 1993, five in 1994 and three in 1995. For the last three years of its existence, the magazine was published only once a year.

1998, last issue
The magazine's final print publication was November 1998, after which the contract was renegotiated and, in a sharp reversal, J2 Communications was then prohibited from publishing issues of the magazine. J2, however, still owned the rights to the brand name, which it continued to franchise out to other users. In 2002, the use of the brand name and the rights to republish old material were sold to a new, and otherwise unrelated, company which chose to call itself National Lampoon, Incorporated.

2007, DVD-ROM
In 2007, in association with Graphic Imaging Technology, Inc.  National Lampoon, Inc. released a collection of the entire 246 issues of the magazine in .pdf format viewable with Adobe Acrobat.  The cover of the DVD box featured a remake of the January 1973 "Death" issue, with the caption altered to read "If You Don”t Buy This DVD-ROM, We’ll Kill This Dog". The pages are viewable on both Windows (starting with Windows 2000) and Macintosh (starting with OSX) systems.

Related media
During its most active period, the magazine spun off numerous productions in a wide variety of media.
National Lampoon released books, special issues, anthologies, and other print pieces, including:

Special editions
 The Best of National Lampoon No. 1, 1971, an anthology
 The Breast of National Lampoon (a "Best of" No. 2), 1972, an anthology
 The Best of National Lampoon No. 3, 1973, an anthology, art directed by Michael Gross
 National Lampoon The Best of #4, 1973, an anthology, art directed by Gross
 The National Lampoon Encyclopedia of Humor, 1973, edited by Michael O'Donoghue and art directed by Gross.This publication featured the fake Volkswagen ad seen above, which was written by Anne Beatts. The spoof was listed in the contents page as "Doyle Dane Bernbach," the name of the advertising agency that had produced the iconic 1960s ad campaign for Volkswagen. According to Mark Simonson's "Very Large National Lampoon Site": "If you buy a copy of this issue, you may find the ad is missing. As a result of a lawsuit by VW over the ad for unauthorized use of their trademark, NatLamp was forced to remove the page (with razor blades!) from any copies they still had in inventory (which, from what I gather, was about half the first printing of 250,000 copies) and all subsequent reprints."
 National Lampoon Comics, an anthology, 1974, art directed by Gross and David Kaestle
 National Lampoon The Best of No. 5, 1974, an anthology, art directed by Gross and Kaestle
 National Lampoon 1964 High School Yearbook Parody, 1974, Edited by P.J. O'Rourke and Doug Kenney, art directed by Kaestle.
 National Lampoon Presents The Very Large Book of Comical Funnies, 1975, edited by Sean Kelly
 National Lampoon The 199th Birthday Book, 1975, edited by Tony Hendra
 National Lampoon The Gentleman's Bathroom Companion, 1975 edited by Hendra, art directed by Peter Kleinman
 Official National Lampoon Bicentennial Calendar 1976, 1975, written and compiled by Christopher Cerf & Bill Effros
 National Lampoon Art Poster Book, 1975, Design direction by Peter Kleinman
 The Best of National Lampoon No. 6, 1976, an anthology
 National Lampoon The Iron On Book 1976, Original T-shirt designs, edited by Tony Hendra, art directed by Peter Kleinman.
 National Lampoon Songbook, 1976, edited by Sean Kelly, musical parodies in sheet music form
 National Lampoon The Naked and the Nude: Hollywood and Beyond, 1977, written by Brian McConnachie
 The Best of National Lampoon No. 7, 1977, an anthology
 National Lampoon Presents French Comics, 1977, edited by Peter Kaminsky, translators Sophie Balcoff, Sean Kelly, and Valerie Marchant
 National Lampoon The Up Yourself Book, 1977, Gerry Sussman
 National Lampoon Gentleman's Bathroom Companion 2, 1977, art directed by Peter Kleinman.
 National Lampoon The Book of Books, 1977 edited by Jeff Greenfield, art directed by Peter Kleinman
 The Best of National Lampoon No. 8, 1978, an anthology, Cover photo by Chris Callis, art directed by Peter Kleinman
 National Lampoon's Animal House Book, 1978, Chris Miller, Harold Ramis, Doug Kenney Art Direction by Peter Kleinman and Judith Jacklin Belushi
 National Lampoon Sunday Newspaper Parody, 1978 (claiming to be a Sunday issue of the Dacron, Ohio (a spoof on Akron, Ohio) Republican–Democrat, this publication was originally issued in loose newsprint sections, mimicking a genuine American Sunday newspaper.) Art Direction and Design by Skip Johnston
 National Lampoon Presents Claire Bretécher, 1978, work by Claire Bretécher, French satirical cartoonist, 1978, Sean Kelly (editor), Translator Valerie Marchant
 Slightly Higher in Canada, 1978, Anthology of Canadian humor from National Lampoon. Sean Kelly and Ted Mann (Editors)
 Cartoons Even We Won't Dare Print, 1979, Sean Kelly and John Weidman (Editors), Simon and Schuster
 National Lampoon The Book of Books, 1979, Edited by Jeff Greenfield. Designed and Art Directed by Peter Kleinman
 National Lampoon Tenth Anniversary Anthology 1970–1980 1979 Edited by P.J. O'Rourke, art directed by Peter Kleinman
 National Lampoon Best Of #9: The Good Parts 1978-1980, 1981, the last anthology.

Books
 Would You Buy A Used War From This Man?, 1972, edited by Henry Beard
 Letters from the Editors of National Lampoon, 1973, edited by Brian McConnachie
 National Lampoon This Side of Parodies, 1974, edited by Brian McConnachie and Sean Kelly
 The Paperback Conspiracy, 1974, Anthology, Brian McConnachie (editor) Warner Paperback Library
 The Job of Sex, 1974, edited by Brian McConnachie
 A Dirty Book!, 1976, Sexual Humor from the National Lampoon. P.J. O'Rourke (editor). New American Library,
 Another Dirty Book Sexual Humor from the National Lampoon. P.J. O'Rourke and Peter Kaminsky (editors)
 National Lampoon's Doon, 1984

"True Facts" special editions and books
 National Lampoon True Facts, 1981, compiled by John Bendel, special edition
 National Lampoon Peekers & Other True Facts, 1982, by John Bendel, special edition
 National Lampoon Presents True Facts: The Book, 1991, by John Bendel "Amazing Ads, Stupefying Signs, Weird Wedding Announcements, and Other Absurd-but-True Samples of Real-Life Funny stuff" by John Bendel, trade paperback by Contemporary Press (now McGraw Hill)
 National Lampoon Presents More True Facts, 1992 Contemporary Press
 National Lampoon's Big Book of True Facts: 2004 Brand-New Collection of Absurd-but-True Real-Life Funny Stuff

(There were also four all-True-Facts regular issues of the magazine, in 1985, 1986, 1987, and 1988.)

Recordings

Vinyl

Vinyl record albums
 National Lampoon Radio Dinner, 1972, produced by Tony Hendra
 Lemmings, 1973, an album of material taken from the stage show Lemmings, and produced by Tony Hendra
 National Lampoon Missing White House Tapes, 1974, an album taken from the radio show, creative directors Tony Hendra and Sean Kelly
 Official National Lampoon Stereo Test and Demonstration Record, 1974, conceived by and written by Ed Subitzky
 National Lampoon Gold Turkey, 1975, creative director Brian McConnachie. Cover Photography by Chris Callis. Art Direction by Peter Kleinman
 National Lampoon Goodbye Pop 1952–1976, 1975, creative director Sean Kelly
 National Lampoon That's Not Funny, That's Sick, 1977. Art directed by Peter Kleinman. Illustrated by Sam Gross
 National Lampoon's Animal House (album), 1978, soundtrack album from the movie
 Greatest Hits of the National Lampoon, 1978
 National Lampoon White Album, 1979
 National Lampoon Sex, Drugs, Rock 'N' Roll & the End of the World, 1982

Vinyl singles
 A snide parody of Les Crane's 1971 hit "Desiderata", written by Tony Hendra, was recorded and released as "Deteriorata", and stayed on the lower reaches of the Billboard magazine charts for a month in late 1972. "Deteriorata" also became one of National Lampoon bestselling posters.
 The gallumphing theme to Animal House rose slightly higher and charted slightly longer in December 1978.

Cassette tape
 National Lampoon Radio Dinner, 1972, produced by Tony Hendra
 Lemmings, 1973, an album of material taken from the stage show Lemmings, and produced by Tony Hendra
 National Lampoon Missing White House Tapes, 1974, an album taken from the radio show, creative directors Tony Hendra and Sean Kelly
 National Lampoon Gold Turkey, 1975, creative director Brian McConnachie. Cover Photography by Chris Callis. Art Direction by Peter Kleinman
 National Lampoon Goodbye Pop 1952–1976, 1975, creative director Sean Kelly
 National Lampoon That's Not Funny, That's Sick, 1977. Art directed by Peter Kleinman. Illustrated by Sam Gross
 National Lampoon's Animal House (album), 1978, soundtrack album from the movie
 Greatest Hits of the National Lampoon, 1978
 National Lampoon White Album, 1979
 The Official National Lampoon Car Stereo Test and Demonstration Tape, 1980, conceived and written by Ed Subitzky
 National Lampoon Sex, Drugs, Rock 'N' Roll & the End of the World, 1982

CDs
 A single CD release, National Lampoon Gold Turkey recordings from The National Lampoon Radio Hour, was released by Rhino Records in 1996.
 A three-CD boxed set Buy This Box or We'll Shoot This Dog: The Best of the National Lampoon Radio Hour was released in 1996.
Many of the older albums that were originally on vinyl have been re-issued as CDs and a number of tracks from certain albums are available as MP3s.

Radio
 The National Lampoon Radio Hour was a nationally syndicated radio comedy show which was on the air weekly from 1973 to 1974. For a complete listing of shows, see. Former Lampoon editor Tony Hendra later revived this format in 2012 for The Final Edition Radio Hour, which became a podcast for National Lampoon, Inc. in 2015.
 True Facts, 1977–1978, written by and starring Peter Kaminsky, Ellis Weiner, Danny Abelson, Sylvia Grant

Theater
 Lemmings (1973) was National Lampoon most successful theatrical venture. The off-Broadway production took the form of a parody of the Woodstock Festival. Co-written by Tony Hendra and Sean Kelly, and directed and produced by Hendra, it introduced John Belushi, Chevy Chase and Christopher Guest in their first major roles. The show formed several companies and ran for a year at New York's Village Gate. A touring show called "That's not Funny That's Sick" toured the US & Canada 1976-77
 The National Lampoon Radio Hour, 1975, with John Belushi, Brian Doyle Murray, Bill Murray, Gilda Radner and Harold Ramis.
 If We're Late, Start Without Us!, 1979, head writer Sean Kelly
 National Lampoon's Class of '86: This show was performed at the Village Gate in 1986, aired on cable in the 1980s, and was subsequently available on VHS.

Television
 Delta House, 1979, Universal Television for ABC-TV Network (two derivative frat house projects, NBC's Brothers and Sisters and CBS' Co-Ed Fever aired at the same time. None of the series were successful.)
 National Lampoon's Comedy Playoffs, 1990, Showtime Networks

Films

Considerable ambiguity exists about what actually constitutes a National Lampoon film.

During the 1970s and early 1980s, a few films were made as spin-offs from the original National Lampoon magazine, using its creative staff. The first theatrical release, and by far the most successful National Lampoon film was National Lampoon's Animal House (1978). Starring John Belushi and written by Doug Kenney, Harold Ramis, and Chris Miller, it became the highest-grossing comedy film of that time. Produced on a low budget, it was so enormously profitable that, from that point on for the next two decades, the name "National Lampoon" applied to the title of a movie was considered to be a valuable selling point in and of itself.

Numerous movies were subsequently made that had "National Lampoon" as part of the title. Many of these were unrelated projects because, by that time, the name "National Lampoon" could simply be licensed on a one-time basis, by any company, for a fee. Critics such as the Orlando Sentinel′s Roger Moore and The New York Times′ Andrew Adam Newman have written about the cheapening of the National Lampoon′s movie imprimatur; in 2006, an Associated Press review said: "The National Lampoon, once a brand name above nearly all others in comedy, has become shorthand for pathetic frat boy humor."

The first of the National Lampoon movies was a not-very-successful made-for-TV movie:
 Disco Beaver from Outer Space, broadcast in 1978.

National Lampoon's Animal House
In 1978, National Lampoon's Animal House was released. Made on a small budget, it did phenomenally well at the box office. In 2001, the United States Library of Congress considered the film "culturally significant" and preserved it in the National Film Registry.

The script had its origins in a series of short stories that had been previously published in the magazine. These included Chris Miller's "Night of the Seven Fires", which dramatized a fraternity initiation and included the characters Pinto and Otter, which contained prose versions of the toga party, the "road trip", and the dead horse incident. Another source was Doug Kenney's "First Lay Comics", which included the angel and devil scene and the grocery-cart affair. According to the authors, most of these elements were based on real incidents.

The film was of great cultural significance to its time, as The New York Times describes the magazine's 1970s period as "Hedonism {} in full sway and political correctness in its infancy." Animal House, as the article describes was a crucial film manifestation of that culture.

An article from The Atlantic Monthly describes how Animal House captures the struggle between "elitist {fraternity} who willingly aligned itself with the establishment, and the kind full of kooks who refused to be tamed." That concept was a crucial figment of the early National Lampoon Magazine, according to a New York Times article concerning the early years of the Magazine and co-founder Douglas Kenney's brand of comedy as a "liberating response to a rigid and hypocritical culture."

National Lampoon's Class Reunion

This 1982 movie was an attempt by John Hughes to make something similar to Animal House. National Lampoon's Class Reunion was not successful, however.

National Lampoon's Vacation

Released in 1983, the movie National Lampoon's Vacation was based upon John Hughes's National Lampoon story "Vacation '58". The movie's financial success gave rise to several follow-up films, including National Lampoon's European Vacation (1985), National Lampoon's Christmas Vacation (1989), based on John Hughes's "Christmas '59", Vegas Vacation (1997), and most recently Vacation (2015), all featuring Chevy Chase.

Similar films
The Robert Altman film O.C. and Stiggs (1987) was based on two characters who had been featured in several written pieces in National Lampoon magazine, including an issue-long story from October 1982 entitled "The Utterly Monstrous, Mind-Roasting Summer of O.C. and Stiggs." Completed in 1984, the film was not released until 1987, when it was shown in a small number of theaters and without the "National Lampoon" name. It was not a success.

Following the success of Animal House, MAD  magazine lent its name to a 1980 comedy titled Up the Academy. Although two of Animal House co-writers were the Lampoon Doug Kenney and Chris Miller, Up The Academy was strictly a licensing maneuver, with no creative input from Mad staff or contributors. It was a critical and commercial failure.

Film about the magazine
In 2015, a documentary film was released called National Lampoon: Drunk Stoned Brilliant Dead. The film featured a great deal of content from the magazine, as well as interviews with staff members and fans, and it explains how the magazine changed the course of humor.

The 2018 film A Futile and Stupid Gesture, a biography of co-founder Douglas Kenney, also depicts the magazine's early years. The film was described by a 2018 New York Times article as a "snapshot of a moment where comedy's freshest counter-culture impulse was gleefully crass and willfully offensive." In the same article, Kenney was said to "spot a comical hollowness and rot in the society he and his peers were trained to join."

Notes

References

Further reading
 Going Too Far, Tony Hendra, 1987, Doubleday, New York. 
 If You Don't Buy This Book, We'll Kill This Dog! Life, Laughs, Love, & Death at National Lampoon 1994, Matty Simmons, Barricade Books, New York. 
 Mr. Mike: The Life and Work of Michael O'Donoghue, Dennis Perrin, 1998, AvonBooks, New York. 
 A Futile and Stupid Gesture: How Doug Kenney and National Lampoon Changed Comedy Forever, Josh Karp, 2006. 
 That's Not Funny, That's Sick: The National Lampoon and the Comedy Insurgents Who Captured the Mainstream, Ellin Stein, 2013, W. W. Norton & Company, New York.

External links
 Mark's Very Large National Lampoon website
 Gallery of all National Lampoon covers, 1970-1998
 Two part interview with the Lampoon's first female contributing editor, Anne Beatts, on her involvement with the magazine: Part One / Part Two
 Gallery of art director Michael Gross' covers and art
 [https://www.nytimes.com/2005/07/03/arts/03tapp.html?pagewanted=1&ei=5090&en=7912f064b27caa5b&ex=1278043200&partner=rssuserland&emc=rss "National Lampoon Grows Up By Dumbing Down] by Jake Tapper, The New York Times'', July 3, 2005.
 List of National Lampoon movies
 

 
Satirical magazines published in the United States
Black comedy
Defunct magazines published in the United States
English-language magazines
Epic Records artists
Magazines established in 1969
Magazines disestablished in 1998
Radar Records artists
1970s in comedy
1980s in comedy
1990s in comedy